HD 213240 b is an extrasolar planet located approximately 133 light-years (41 parsecs) from the Solar System in the constellation of Grus. It is a gas giant orbiting the G-type star HD 213240. 

The planet was discovered in 2001 in the context of the CORALIE  extra-solar planet search program. It was described in a 2001 publication by astronomers N. C. Santos, M. Mayor, D. Naef, F. Pepe, D. Queloz, S. Udry and M. Burnet of Observatoire de Genève, Switzerland. Doppler spectroscopy was used.

See also
 HD 212301 b
 Methods of detecting extrasolar planets

References

External links
 
 

Grus (constellation)
Giant planets
Exoplanets discovered in 2001
Exoplanets detected by radial velocity